Larry D. Foster (born November 7, 1976 in Harvey, Louisiana) is a former American football wide receiver in the National Football League. He was signed by the Detroit Lions as an undrafted free agent in 2000. He played college football at LSU.

Foster also played for the Arizona Cardinals.

External links
Detroit Lions bio

1976 births
Living people
American football wide receivers
LSU Tigers football players
Detroit Lions players
Arizona Cardinals players
People from Harvey, Louisiana